KFM or Kfm may refer to:

Radio stations 
 Kfm 94.5, South Africa
 Kfm (Ireland), Ireland
 KFM Radio, Greater Manchester, England
 KMFM West Kent, Kent, England

Organisations and companies 
 Knights of Father Matthew, a catholic temperance society that originated in Ireland
 Komet Flight Motor, an Italian aircraft engine manufacturer
 Kommunistiska Förbundet Marxist-Leninisterna, former Swedish communist party
 Kronofogdemyndigheten, Swedish government agency handling debt collection, distraint and evictions

Other uses 
 Kearny fallout meter, an expedient radiation meter, which can be made from household items
 Kelvin probe force microscope
 The KDE file manager, now replaced by Konqueror
 Keysi Fighting Method, a martial art with roots in Jeet Kun Do, Wing Chun, and street fighting
 The Kentucky Fried Movie, an American comedy film, released in 1977 and directed by John Landis